2009 Yokohama FC season

Competitions

Player statistics

Other pages
 J. League official site

Yokohama FC
Yokohama FC seasons